Chris Loulis (born April 10, 1976) is a Greek film, television and stage actor. He took part at the 2004 Summer Olympics opening ceremony.

Filmography

External links 
 

Greek male actors
21st-century Greek male actors
Living people
1976 births
Male actors from Athens